François Luambo Luanzo Makiadi (6 July 1938 – 12 October 1989) was a Congolese musician. He was a major figure in 20th-century Congolese music, and African music in general, principally as the leader for over 30 years of TPOK Jazz, the most popular and significant African band of its time.  He is  referred to as Franco Luambo or simply Franco.  Known for his mastery of African Rumba, he was nicknamed by fans and critics "Sorcerer of the Guitar" and the "Grand Maître of Zairean Music", as well as Franco de Mi Amor by female fans. His most known hit, "Mario", sold more than 200,000 copies and was certified gold.

Early life
When his father, a railroad worker, died in 1949, he ended his formal education at age 10 or 11 and helped his mother by playing a homemade guitar, harmonica and other instruments to attract customers to her market stall in Léopoldville's Ngiri-Ngiri neighborhood. He also honed his guitar-playing by working with Paul "Dewayon" Ebengo, a slightly older friend who had a real guitar.

In 1950, Franco (then age 12), Dewayon (age 16), and others formed a group called Watam, which played together for three years, playing weddings and funerals and with the help of a mentor of Franco's, the established musician Albert Luampasi, recording a few songs on the Ngoma record label.

Career
In 1953, Franco and Dewayon auditioned for musician and producer Henri Bowane, then with Leopoldville's Loningisa record label and studio, who hired both as studio musicians. Franco released at least three records in 1953 with Watam on Loningisa, on which he was credited as Lwambo François.  Also in 1953, Franco released on Loningisa his first solo record, "Bolingo Na Ngai Na Beatrice" (my love for Beatrice), which made Franco a local celebrity in Kinshasa.  Bowane is also said to have given the young musician his lifelong name, Franco.

In 1955, Franco was among a loose group of Leopoldville musicians that began working together under the auspices of the Loningisa studio; the group was known as Bana Loningisa (children of Loningisa).  In 1956, an original founding core of six of those musicians, with Franco as the sole guitarist, agreed to accept a regular, paid gig at the O.K. Bar, named after its owner, Oskar Kashama.  A few weeks later, needing a name for a contract, the band used OK Jazz, from the place it had begun (it has also been said that O.K. stood for Orchestre Kinois, or the band of Kinshasa), and they were "baptized" under that name at a June 6, 1956 show at the O.K. Bar.  While clarinetist Jean Serge Essous was the original leader of O.K. Jazz, Franco was a prolific songwriter; Essous called him a "kind of genius" for having written over a hundred songs in his notebooks at that time.  O.K. Jazz quickly became a rival to the leading established local band of that time, African Jazz under Joseph Kabasele. In December 1956, after some personnel changes, the new (and short-lived) lineup of O.K. Jazz released a rumba written by Franco' that would become the band's motto: "On Entre O.K., On Sort K.O."

In 1957, O.K. Jazz lost its leader, Essous, as well as original vocalist Philippe "Rossignol" Lando, when they were hired away by Bowane for his new record label, Esengo (Bowane had left Loningisa after being outshone there by O.K. Jazz).  While vocalist Vicky Longomba became the band's new leader, Franco also stepped up.

In 1958, after O.K. Jazz returned to Leopoldville after a year in Brazzaville, Franco was arrested and jailed for a "motoring offence." Upon his release, he regained and reinforced his local reputation as the "Sorcerer of the Guitar."  His guitar technique was so influential that by the end of the 1950s and for years afterward, Congolese guitarists were divided into two camps, one led by Franco and the other led by Docteur Nico of Joseph Kabasele's African Jazz.

Through the 1960s, Franco and O.K. Jazz "toured regularly and recorded prolifically."  By 1967 Franco was a co-leader of the band, with vocalist Vicky.  When Vicky left in 1970, Franco became the sole leader of the band.

And then, another change to Tout Puissant O.K. Jazz (T.P.O.K. Jazz) (which stands in French for The Almighty O.K. Jazz)

In 1978, Franco was imprisoned for two months by Zaire's President Mobutu for the lyrics to his songs "Helene" and "Jackie."  Later the same year, however, President Mobutu decorated him for his musical contributions.

Luambo recorded a 21-minute track, “Na Lingaka Yo Yo Te”. It is the longest song recorded by a Congolese artist.

Franco played in the United States once, in 1983, appearing twice in New York's Manhattan Center.

In his thirty-three years with the band, Franco and TPOK Jazz released hundreds of singles and over 100 albums.

Politics
Luambo was a vocal supporter of Zaire's ruler Mobutu Sese Seko. However, they soon became enemies.

Personal life
Franco was married twice. He reportedly fathered eighteen children (seventeen of them girls) with fourteen women.

Death
Franco died on 12 October 1989, at Namur in Belgium, of AIDS. (He never publicly acknowledged having AIDS, and while many sources flatly report it as the cause of death, others report this as unconfirmed, e.g., The New Yorker uses "of an illness believed to be AIDS.")  Upon his death, President Mobutu declared four days of national mourning in Zaire.

Recorded output
It is difficult to summarize the enormous volume of recordings issued by Franco (virtually all of them with TPOK Jazz), and work remains to be done in this area.  The range of estimates suggest both the size of, and the uncertainties about, his output. An often-cited number is that Graeme Ewens listed eighty-four albums in the thoroughly researched discography (based on the work of Ronnie Graham) in Ewens' 1994 biography of Franco; this list does not include compilation albums that also have other performers, or O.K. Jazz tribute albums and compilations issued after Franco's death (Ewens noted about this number that "it falls short of the 150 albums which Franco claimed back in the mid-1980s, but no doubt some of those were collections of singles for the African market").  Ten albums on the list were issued in 1983 alone.  Other statements include: "he released roughly 150 albums and three thousand songs, of which Franco himself wrote about one thousand;" "Franco’s prolific output amounted to T.P.O.K releasing two songs a week over his nearly 40-year career, which ultimately comprised a catalogue of some 1000 songs;" "With his band OK Jazz he released at least 400 singles (more than half later compiled onto LP or CD) .  . . .  Ewens list 36 CDs; Asahi-net has 83;" and "from June 1956 to August 1961 the band recorded 320 tracks for the 78 rpm music label Loningisa."

As a rough explanation of its nature, in the 1950s and 1960s Franco and TPOK Jazz issued singles, either 78rpm (1950s) or 45rpm (1960s), as well as some albums that were compilations of singles, and in the 1970s and 1980s they issued longer albums.  All of this was done by a large number of record labels, in a variety of countries in Africa and Europe as well as the United States.  In the 1990s, many of the albums were reissued in CD form by various record labels but haphazardly reorganized, often combining various parts of multiple albums onto single CDs.  Since 2000, several compilations have been issued collecting aspects of Franco's work, most notably Francophonic, a pair of two-CD sets of highlights issued by Stern's in 2007 and 2009 and spanning Franco's entire career.  Through 2020, the Planet Ilunga record label is still able to issue (on vinyl and digitally) compilations that include tracks which had never been reissued since their original release as singles.

Musical style, critical evaluations, and significance

Franco's guitar playing was unlike that of bluesmen such as Muddy Waters or rock and rollers like Chuck Berry. Instead of raw, single-note lines, Franco built his band's style around crisp open chords, often of only two notes, which "bounced around the beat." Major thirds and sixths and other consonant intervals are said to play the same role in Franco's style that blues notes fill in rock and roll.

Franco's music often relied on huge ensembles, with as many as six vocalists and several guitarists.  According to a description, "horns might engage in an upbeat dialogue with the guitar, or set up hypnotic vamps that carried the song forward as on the crest of a wave," while percussion parts are "a cushion supporting the band, rather than a prod to raise the energy level."

Franco was a member for 33 years, from its founding in 1956 until his death in 1989, of TPOK Jazz, which has been called "arguably the most influential African band of the second half of the 20th century," and he was its co-leader or sole leader for most of that period.

Franco is commonly described as the preeminent African musical figure of the 20th century.  For example, world-music expert Alistair Johnston calls him "the giant of 20th century African music."  A reviewer in The Guardian wrote that Franco "was widely recognised as the continent's greatest musician, back in the years before Ali Farka Touré or Toumani Diabaté."  Ronnie Graham wrote, in his encyclopedic 1988 Da Capo Guide to Contemporary African Music, that "Franco is beyond doubt Africa's most popular and influential musician."  This is in addition to listing Franco first in his book's rank-ordered section on Congo and Zaire, and putting on the book's cover, to represent African music, a waist-up photo of Franco playing guitar.

Selected discography
This is a very preliminary, partial list.

Compilation albums:

See also 
 TPOK Jazz
 Music of the Democratic Republic of the Congo
 Congolese rumba
 Soukous
 List of African musicians

References

Further reading

External links 

 Discography of Franco & OK Jazz
 A fan page for Franco and OK Jazz describing events decade by decade 
 1983 Interview with Franco
 Liner notes from Franco phonic – Vol. 1: 1953–1980 by Ken Braun / Sterns Music 

1938 births
1989 deaths
People from Kongo Central
Belgian Congo people
Democratic Republic of the Congo guitarists
Democratic Republic of the Congo musicians
Soukous musicians
TPOK Jazz members
20th-century guitarists
AIDS-related deaths in the Republic of the Congo
Culture of Kinshasa